Hillroy Paulse (born 6 September 1985) is a South African cricketer.  Paulse represents Boland and the Cape Cobras in the various South African first-class cricket competitions. He has made one appearance for the Cobras in his career so far but is a regular member of the Boland team. He is a  fast-medium bowler and a lower order batsman.

External links

Living people
1985 births
Sportspeople from Paarl
Boland cricketers
Cape Cobras cricketers